The Gungu or (Bagungu) are a Bantu ethnic group native to Uganda. They live on the northeastern shores of Lake Albert along the Rift Valley. They speak a distinct dialect of the Runyoro language called Lugungu. They are traditionally fishermen, Pastoralists and subsistence farmers. Historically, this is because their cradle land Buliisa district, has ecosystems that can allow them to practice all these three economic activities.

Overview
The Bagungu have historically lived in Buliisa District of western Uganda. Traditionally, they were predominantly fishermen and pastoralists but this changed over the years, with the decline of fish stock in Lake Albert and competition for grazing resources, resulting in more cultivation. They have tried to secede from the Bunyoro kingdom in recent times.

Oil Fields 
In 2006, large quantities of oil and gas were discovered in the Albertine Western Region of Uganda. The oil fields are being developed on the ancestral lands of the Bagungu.

References

Bantu people
Ethnic groups in Uganda